Edward Lawrence "Con" Connerton  (1897-1971) was a rugby league footballer for the Eastern Suburbs club in the New South Wales Rugby Football League premiership.

A , he played 4 seasons between 1919-1923 for Easts and was a member of their fourth premiership winning side in NSWRFL season 1923.

"Con" Connerton is recognized as the club's 110th player.

References

Sources
Alan Whiticker & Glen Hudson: The Encyclopedia of Rugby League Players

Australian rugby league players
Rugby league wingers
Rugby league centres
Sydney Roosters players
1897 births
1971 deaths
Place of birth missing